Kentin Mahé (born 22 May 1991) is a French handball player for Telekom Veszprém and the French national team.

Early life
Kentin Mahé was born in Paris and started to play handball at age six in AS Monaco, before briefly representing ASPTT Nice. In 2000, he moved to Germany where he grew up, due to his father Pascal Mahé, a former handball player, taking up several managerial positions in the country.

His maternal grandmother is from Sweden and he lived in Stockholm for four months in 2008, aged 18, playing youth handball with then reigning national champions Hammarby IF.

Career
Mahé returned to Germany in 2009 and made his senior debut for DHC Rheinland, before enjoying stints in VfL Gummersbach and HSV Hamburg.

In 2015, he signed with the German top club SG Flensburg-Handewitt where he developed into a world class-player under the management of Ljubomir Vranjes. He joined the Hungarian club Telekom Veszprém on 1 July 2018.

Achievements

National team
 Olympic Games:
 : 2020
 : 2016
 World Championship:
 : 2015, 2017
 : 2019
 European Men's Handball Championship
 : 2018

Domestic competitions
 Handball-Bundesliga:
 : 2018
 Nemzeti Bajnokság I:
 : 2019

Individual awards
 MVP of the EHF Cup Final Four tournament: 2015
 All-Star team Best Centre Back of the EHF Champions League: 2019, 2022

References

External links

1991 births
Living people
French people of Swedish descent
French male handball players
Handball players from Paris
Handball-Bundesliga players
VfL Gummersbach players
SG Flensburg-Handewitt players
Veszprém KC players
Expatriate handball players
French expatriate sportspeople in Germany
French expatriate sportspeople in Hungary
Olympic handball players of France
Handball players at the 2016 Summer Olympics
Medalists at the 2016 Summer Olympics
Olympic silver medalists for France
Olympic medalists in handball
Handball players at the 2020 Summer Olympics
Medalists at the 2020 Summer Olympics
Olympic gold medalists for France